The Dr. Robinson House is a historic house on Walnut Street east of Center Street in Leslie, Arkansas.  It is a -story wood-frame structure, with a hip-roofed main section and projecting gable sections to the front and rear.  A single-story porch extends across the portion of the front to the right of the gable section, supported by Classical turned columns with a turned balustrade.  A rear screened porch has similar supports.  The house was built c. 1917-18 for a doctor who primarily served local railroad workers.

The house was listed on the National Register of Historic Places in 1993.

See also
National Register of Historic Places listings in Searcy County, Arkansas

References

Houses on the National Register of Historic Places in Arkansas
Colonial Revival architecture in Arkansas
Houses completed in 1917
Houses in Searcy County, Arkansas
National Register of Historic Places in Searcy County, Arkansas